The Rose Maker is a French comedy film, directed by  and released in 2020.

The film stars Catherine Frot as Eve Vernet, a formerly successful rose grower on the verge of bankruptcy, who hires three workers with no horticultural skills and must train them to help save her business. The cast also includes Fatsah Bouyahmed, Olivier Breitman, Olivia Côte, Vincent Dedienne, Melan Omerta and Marie Petiot.

The film entered production in 2019.

The film premiered on 29 August 2020 at the Angoulême Film Festival. It was subsequently screened at several francophone or bilingual film festivals in Canada, including the Cinéfest Sudbury International Film Festival and the Abitibi-Témiscamingue International Film Festival. It is slated to premiere commercially in 2021.

Reception
On Rotten Tomatoes, the film holds an approval rating of 95% based on 21 reviews, with an average rating of 6.50/10.

References

External links
 

2020 films
2020 comedy films
French comedy films
2020s French-language films
2020s French films